Nimc or NIMC may refer to:

 National Identity Management Commission, Nigeria
 National Indian Music Competition
 National Institute of Management Calcutta
 National Interfraternity Music Council
 Northern Ireland Milk Cup, A multinational youth association Football tournament